Zhonglou District is one of five districts under the jurisdiction of Changzhou in Jiangsu province of the People's Republic of China. The local language is the Changzhou dialect of Wu Chinese. The postal code for the district is 213002. Zhonglou covers an area of 71 square kilometers. In 2001 the total population was recorded at 320,000 people.

It is also the location of the Nan Da Jie shopping mall, one of the unofficial centers of the city. Nan Da Jie is home to many restaurants and chain stores as well as a number of educational companies and apartment complexes.

The district takes its name from a large belfry that once stood in the area.

Administrative divisions
In the present, Zhonglou District has 7 subdistricts.
7 subdistricts

References

External links
Official site of the Zhonglou district government (Chinese)

County-level divisions of Jiangsu
Changzhou